Ash Wednesday is a 1973 American dark drama film directed by Larry Peerce and starring Elizabeth Taylor. It was produced by Dominick Dunne. The screenplay by Jean-Claude Tramont focuses on the effect that extensive cosmetic surgery has on the life of a middle-aged married woman.

Plot
In a desperate attempt to save her faltering marriage, 55-year-old Barbara Sawyer submits to full-body plastic surgery in a Swiss clinic, then checks into an exclusive ski resort Cortina d'Ampezzo to await the arrival of her attorney husband Mark. Reveling in her considerably younger and tauter appearance, she allows playboy Erich to seduce her. When Mark finally arrives, he makes an announcement that changes Barbara's initial plans forever.

Cast
Elizabeth Taylor as Barbara Sawyer 
Henry Fonda as Mark Sawyer 
Helmut Berger as Erich 
Keith Baxter as David

Production
Producer Dominick Dunne wrote, “there were problems on the picture right from the beginning. We kept getting more and more behind schedule. A lot of us were drinking too much, as was I, and a few were snorting too much, as was I … Elizabeth [Taylor] was chronically late …” sometimes as many as three hours late, but Dunne felt it would be pointless to try to rein in the star. Dunne also alleges that when he was a stage manager in 1950s New York he had known the screenwriter as a pageboy called Jack Schwartz: “it made for complications on the picture, on top of the complications of being overschedule and overbudget.”

Critical reception
The film's critical reception was reasonably favorable, particularly for Taylor, who was nominated for a Golden Globe. Rex Reed's review in The New York Observer amounted to a love letter to Taylor: "She's subtle, sensitive, glowing with freshness and beauty, fifty pounds lighter in weight, her hair is coiffed simply, her clothes ravishing, her make-up a symphony of perfection. For those who grew up in love with Elizabeth Taylor, the movie is pure magic. She is once again the kind of star marquees light up for."

Variety agreed: "Taylor, fashionably gowned and bejeweled carries the film almost single-handedly. Fonda is excellent in his climactic appearance, an unusually superb casting idea. Taylor's performance also is very good, and relative to many of her recent roles, this is one of the strongest and most effective in some time. Her Beauty remains sensational."

Vincent Canby of The New York Times added a dissenting voice, saying the film "was directed by Larry Peerce...and written by Jean-Claude Tramont with all the fearlessness and perception demanded in the boiling of an egg."

Roger Dooley of The Village Voice disagreed, thinking the film "Elizabeth Taylor's best role in years...Jean-Claude Tramont's screenplay, directed by Larry Peerce, makes one remember why millions of people used to enjoy movies."

In a critique that spoils the plot, Roger Ebert of the Chicago Sun-Times wrote "The movie's story is not really very interesting, but we're intrigued because the star is Taylor. She's 40 or 41 now, and yet she looks great. There's a kind of voyeuristic sensuality in watching her look at herself in the mirror (which she spends no end of time doing)...Maybe the fundamental problem with the movie is that we can't quite believe any man would leave Elizabeth Taylor. It's a good thing we never see Henry Fonda's bimbo, because if we did, we wouldn't be convinced."

Awards and nominations
Elizabeth Taylor was nominated for the Golden Globe Award for Best Actress – Motion Picture Drama.

See also
 List of American films of 1973

References

External links 

1973 films
1973 drama films
American drama films
Films shot in Italy
Paramount Pictures films
Films directed by Larry Peerce
Films scored by Maurice Jarre
Works about plastic surgery
1970s English-language films
1970s American films